St. Lewis may refer to:

 St. Lewis, Newfoundland and Labrador, Canada
 St. Lewis (Fox Harbour) Airport
 A ward in the former federal electoral district of Montreal East, Quebec, Canada
 Keni St. Lewis, American songwriter; see, for example, "Heaven Must Be Missing an Angel"

See also
 Saint Louis (disambiguation)
 St. Louis, Missouri, United States